The Tampella 100 PSTK (from Finnish , '100 millimetre anti-tank gun'; Tampella project name ) is a Finnish towed 100 mm anti-tank gun, designed in the 1980s by Tampella. It was designed for commonality with the D-10T tank gun, in use by the Finnish Defence Forces in the T-54 and T-55 tanks, as well as the 100 56 TK coastal artillery piece. However, due to multitude of reasons it never went into serial production.

Development
In 1986 chief of the Infantry Office of the Finnish Defence Command, Lt. Col. Paavo Kuronen, brought out the question of a range gap in anti-tank weaponry, between contemporary man-portable anti-tank weaponry and anti-tank missiles, ie. 400 and 1000 metres, as well as the multitude of armed vehicles and their rising performance against infantry on the contemporary battlefield. In addition, the FDF Defence Command was worrying of the lack of suitable anti-tank weaponry at the aforementioned ranges to match the increasingly more common explosive reactive armour and layered composite armour. At the time, Finland was also in the process of scrapping its stock of obsolete 75 PstK 40 anti-tank guns (German 7.5 cm Pak 40). The existing 95 S 58-61 recoilless rifle was theoretically suitable, but its backblast was a remarkable downside, and the old ammunition types didn't offer much to defeat the reactive and composite armour. To this dilemma, the Infantry Office proposed a new anti-tank gun firing modern armour-piercing fin-stabilized discarding sabot (APFSDS) ammunition, a system which could be manufactured entirely in Finland (as opposed to the American and Soviet anti-tank missile systems currently in use by FDF).

The FDF Defence Command Infantry Office created a draft of specifications and presented them to Tampella in spring 1986. The new anti-tank gun was to use the barrel and breech block (complete barrel assembly) of the Soviet D-10T (which was in use by FDF in the existing T-54, T-55 and 100 56 TK systems), with a new carriage, cradle (including recoil system) and traverse unit. Thanks to this, it could use the new Mecar APFSDS which was introduced to the T-55 in the FDF T-55M project. It was to have an auxiliary power unit (APU) for assisted movement, a shield to protect from small arms fire and both day and image intensifier based night sights. Its combat weight was to be under 3 tonnes, traverse 60° (±30° from centreline) and elevation -10° to +20°, according to the initial specifications.

After initial calculations by Tampella, FDF Defence Command ordered Tampella to design the gun in May 1987. Tampella ordered the design of the carriage from Sisu Defence, while Tampella concentrated on the design of the gun itself. After the design was ready in November 1987, a prototype gun was ordered by FDF in February 1988, and the final specifications were given. The prototype was delivered in August 1989 after some issues, and field trials were held from January to June 1990 in the Lapland Jaeger Battalion at Sodankylä and to the end of 1990 in the Armoured Brigade at Hämeenlinna.

The trials proved many serious issues: the APU was underpowered for the gun, steering the carriage was difficult and the towing bar of the carriage proved to be too weak, as it fractured repeatedly in use, and the muzzle brake broke due to the pieces of the sabot hitting it. The bore axis was also considered to be too low. The trials were also hindered by lack of spares for the single prototype gun and trivial technical issues such as oil leaks. However, the performance of the gun was considered excellent and the gun was stable in firing position.

The serial production of the gun was intended to be started in 1991, but unsurprisingly, due to the technical issues and a new assessment on the viability of towed anti-tank guns, in July 1991 the FDF Chief of Training Lt. Gen. Matti Kopra officially terminated the project.

The prototype gun was stored in Armoured Brigade, and has been displayed sporadically to the public.

Parts of the recoil mechanism were used in the Patria AMOS and NEMO mortar systems, as Tampella Defence was first merged to FDF Vammaskoski factory after its bankruptcy and subsequently to Patria.

Technical details
Mass under 
Length  (transport) (combat)
Height 
Width 
Ground clearance 
Driving speed 
Towing speed 
Crew 1+7
Rate of fire 6 rpm
Shield to protect from small arms fire
NIFE RS-420 telescopic day sight
Image intensifier night sight

Gun 
Barrel from D-10T:
Calibre 
Barrel assembly length  L/56
Barrel length  L/54
Rifled bore length 
Bore axis height  (combat, 0° elevation)
Breech semi-automatic horizontal sliding block
Elevation -10° to +20°
Traverse ±30° from centreline
Hydro-pneumatic recoil system

Ammunition
JVA 3908 (Mecar M-1000 APFSDS-T)
Round weight 
Muzzle velocity 
Effective firing range 
JVA 3900 (UBR-412D APCBC-T)
Round weight 
Muzzle velocity 
UOF-412 HE
Round weight 
Muzzle velocity

Carriage
APU engine Rotax 635
Two-stroke petrol engine
Power output  at 5,300 rpm
Torque  at 4,700 rpm
Traction wheels 14.5x20
Double Rexroth hydraulic pumps for power transmission
Valmet Black Bear 1600/800 wheel hub motors
Drum brakes
Trail wheel 6.5x16
Hydraulic suspension

Operators

Former operators
  – 1 prototype in trials in 1990, withdrawn at the end of the year.

See also
 D-10 tank gun
 BS-3 100 mm AT/field gun
 100 mm vz. 53 AT/field gun
 2A19/2A29 100 mm AT gun
 2A45 Sprut 125 mm AT gun

References

External links
Presentation of the Tampella anti-tank guns – includes photos of the 100 PSTK.

Artillery of Finland
Anti-tank guns of the Cold War
100 mm artillery